Hahnville High School is a public high school located in Boutte, Louisiana, United States. It is part of the St. Charles Parish Public School System, serving grades 9 through 12. J.B. Martin and R.K. Smith Middle Schools are the feeder schools for Hahnville High School. 

Students living on the west bank of the Mississippi River in St. Charles Parish are assigned to the school. Residents of Ama, Bayou Gauche, Boutte, Des Allemands (area of town located in St. Charles Parish), Hahnville, Killona, Luling, and Paradis are assigned to the school.

History 
Founded in 1924 in the parish seat of Hahnville, Louisiana, the school moved to its present location at Boutte, Louisiana in 1976. Hahnville High School has maintained its accreditation from the Southern Association of Colleges and Schools every year since 1948.

In 1969, then all-black G. W. Carver High School in Hahnville was closed and its students moved to Hahnville High.

Beginning in 2005, students in grades 11 and 12 from both Hahnville and Destrehan have had the option to attend the school district's Satellite Center for half of the school day. The goal is for students to concentrate on career paths that are projected to expand the most over the next decade. Courses at the Satellite Center include: Advanced Television Broadcasting, Digital Media, Engineering Design, Interactive Media, Process Technology (PTEC), Health Care Exploration, Patient Care, Hotel-Restaurant and Tourism (HRT) Administration, Culinary Arts, and Students Teaching And Reaching (STAR). As of the 2018-2019 school year, the Satellite Center added courses in Instrumentation and Health Clinical. Thus, the courses of Digital Media, Interactive Media, and Advanced Television Broadcasting were moved into the academic wing of the school district's brand new Rodney Lafon Performing Arts Center less than a block away from the Satellite Center. Despite the move, these three courses are still considered a part of the Satellite Center.

Since moving to its new campus, Hahnville High has grown to nine buildings.

Extracurricular activities 

 National Honor Society
 National Beta Club
 Spanish Honor Society
 Student Council
 Air Force JROTC Unit LA-933
 The Fighting Tiger Marching Band
 Color Guard
 Choir
 Cheerleading
 Dance Team (Hi-Steppers)
 Fellowship of Christian Athletes
 FAM (Freshman Advisory Mentor)
 FBLA (Future Business Leaders of America)
 InterAct Club
 Literary Society
 Science Olympiad
 Television Production
 Webmastering
 Yearbook
 Big Guns Club
 Team 2183 - Tigerbots
 French Club
 Peer Mentoring
 Green Club
 Superfans
 Art Club
 Alpha Mu Omega
 Kappa Psi Gamma
 The Strategists
 Sleep in a Box 
Anime Club

Athletics 
Hahnville High athletics competes in the LHSAA.

On-campus sports include boys and girls basketball, soccer, tennis, cross country, track and field, baseball, softball, volleyball, as well as football and wrestling.

Off-campus sports include swimming and golf. The swim team has meets at the Mimosa Swim and Racquet Club, and the golf team participates in tournaments at Grand Ridge Golf Club as well as other nearby courses.

Football
Hahnville has won the Louisiana Prep-Football State Championship six times, most recently in 2003. Hahnville has finished in the USA Today Super 25 three times, 1992, 1994, and 2003.

State Championships
(6) 1949, 1968, 1972, 1992, 1994, 2003

Baseball
State Championships
(4) 1948, 1952, 1956, 1957

Softball
During the 2011 season the softball team won the 5A State Championship and finished ranked 16th in the nation.

State Championships
(1) 2011

Notable alumni 
Alfred Blue, NFL running back
LaRon Byrd, NFL wide receiver
Pokey Chatman, WNBA head basketball coach
Dawan Landry, NFL safety
LaRon Landry, NFL safety
Aaron Loup, MLB pitcher
Darius Reynaud, NFL running back and wide receiver 
Garland Robinette, journalist
Pooka Williams Jr., NFL wide receiver

References

External links 
Hahnville High School website

Public high schools in Louisiana
Schools in St. Charles Parish, Louisiana
Educational institutions established in 1924
1924 establishments in Louisiana